Emmanuel Teberen (born 17 June 1974) is a retired Nigerian football defender.

References

1974 births
Living people
Nigerian footballers
Shooting Stars S.C. players
Altay S.K. footballers
Bridge F.C. players
Association football defenders
Nigerian expatriate footballers
Expatriate footballers in Turkey
Nigerian expatriate sportspeople in Turkey
People from Abuja